Comedown or Come Down may refer to:

 Comedown (drugs), the aftereffects of stimulant use
 Comedown (film), a 2012 film starring Adam Deacon
 "Comedown" (song), a 1995 song by Bush
 "The Comedown", a 2008 song by Bring Me the Horizon from Suicide Season
 "The Comedown", a 2013 song by Hadouken! from Every Weekend
 "Come Down", a 1997 single by Toad the Wet Sprocket

See also 
 ...The Dandy Warhols Come Down, a 1997 album by The Dandy Warhols